Electronic skip protection is a data buffer system used in some portable compact disc (CD) players and all MiniDisc (MD) units so that audio would not skip while the disk could not be read due to movement.

Technology
When the buffering circuitry is in operation, the compact disc is read at a fixed read speed or CAV and the content is buffered (with optional ADPCM compression) and fed to RAM within the player.  The audio content is read from RAM, optionally decompressed, and then sent to the digital-to-analog converter.  When the disc reading is interrupted, the player momentarily reads the data stored in RAM while the tracking circuitry finds the passage prior to the interruption on the CD.

Another method has the disc rotating at variable or CLV speed (the normal rotation method for a CD player), but at a slightly higher speed than with the buffer feature switched off.  The buffer method is the same as before.

History
The technology surfaced around 1995 as a physically smaller alternative to the bulky rubber shock absorbers utilized in portable players at the time.  It reduced the size of the hitherto bulky players designed for use in moving cars, in particular.  Small rubber shock absorbers are still used, but are less effective than the larger pre-1995 ones.

When first introduced, 3 seconds was the maximum buffering time. In 2006, the time generally ranged from 10 seconds to "skip-free", where the player will rarely skip.

Due to the nature of the ATRAC compression scheme, and to ensure uninterrupted playback in the presence of fragmentation, all MD decks and portables buffered at least 10 seconds when the format was introduced in 1992.  , MD units have much bigger buffers.

Flash-based MP3 players with no moving parts do not require electronic skip protection.

Pros
Interruption-free performance.

Cons
On older players (1992–1997), battery life is shortened due to the fixed (CAV) read speed of the disc and power required by the memory. Players from 1997 onward have more power-efficient skip protection.

Trade names
"ESP", "Anti-Skip", "Anti-Shock", "Joggable" "G-Shock Protection" (Used by Sony), etc.

References 

Audio software
Compact disc